Silaut railway station is a railway station on Samastipur–Muzaffarpur line under the Sonpur railway division of the East Central Railway zone. The railway station is situated at Raghunathpur, Silaut in Muzaffarpur district of the Indian state of Bihar.

References

Railway stations in Muzaffarpur district
Sonpur railway division